The 2012 United States House of Representatives elections in Indiana were held on Tuesday, November 6, 2012 to elect the nine U.S. representatives from the state, one from each of the state's nine congressional districts. The elections coincided with the elections of other federal and state offices, including a quadrennial presidential election, an election to the U.S. Senate, and a gubernatorial election.

Overview

Redistricting
A redistricting bill was passed by both houses of the Indiana General Assembly in April 2011 and signed into law by Governor Mitch Daniels on May 10, 2011.

The newly drawn map was designed to produce seven districts which are favorable to the Republican Party and two which favor the Democratic Party. Republicans described the districts as being more compact and more in keeping with existing county boundaries than the previous map, while Democrats argue that the map is intended to protect Republican incumbents and help the Republican Party win the 2nd district.

District 1

The district, based in the suburbs and exurbs of Chicago, acquired parts of LaPorte County, including Michigan City, in redistricting.

Democratic primary

Candidates

Nominee
Pete Visclosky , incumbent U.S. Representative

Primary results

Republican primary

Candidates

Nominee
Joel Phelps, industrial engineer

Primary results

General election

Results

District 2

In redistricting, parts of the state which typically favor Republicans, including Elkhart County, Miami County, Wabash County and much of Kosciusko County, were moved into the 2nd district, while Democratic-leaning areas such as Kokomo and part of LaPorte County were removed from the district.

Democratic primary
Prior to announcing his Senate campaign, Donnelly commented that he was confident that a Democrat would be able to win the district, noting that then-Senator Barack Obama would have received 49% of the vote in the district in the 2008 presidential election had it been held under the newly drawn boundaries.

Candidates

Nominee
Brendan Mullen, Army veteran and military contractor

Eliminated in primary
Dan Morrison, small business owner

Withdrawn
Andrew Straw, attorney and an assistant dean at the Indiana University Maurer School of Law

Declined
Joe Donnelly, incumbent U.S. Representative (running for the U.S. Senate)

Primary results

Republican primary

Candidates

Nominee
Jackie Walorski, former state representative and nominee for this seat in 2010

Eliminated in primary
Greg Andrews, physician

Withdrawn
Mitch Feikes, real estate developer and broker

Primary results

Libertarian primary

Candidates

Nominee
Joe Ruiz

Green primary
Andrew Straw, an attorney, switched from the Democratic Party to Green Party and ran for this seat. Straw was an Indiana Supreme Court analyst and an assistant dean at the Indiana University Maurer School of Law in charge of the International Program. He was however was disqualified from the ballot in July.

General election

Endorsements

Predictions

Results

District 3

The 3rd district is expected to remain favorable to Republicans. Among the changes made in redistricting were the removal of Elkhart County from the 4th district to the 2nd, and the addition of areas south of Fort Wayne, which might have made Stutzman vulnerable to a primary challenge.

Republican primary

Candidates

Nominee
Marlin Stutzman, incumbent U.S. Representative

Primary results

Democratic primary

Candidates

Nominee
Kevin Boyd, pastor of Fort Wayne's Trinity Presbyterian Church

Eliminated in primary
Stephen Hope
Justin Kuhnle, family case manager
John Roberson, former police officer
Tommy Schrader
David Sowards

Primary results

General election

Results

District 4

Republican incumbent Todd Rokita ran for re-election in 2012. Rokita's home lies "about 500 yards" outside the boundaries of the newly drawn 4th district, a phenomenon he attributed in May 2011 to "a kind of comeuppance thing" on the part of members of the Indiana General Assembly in return for his having supported a nonpartisan redistricting process during his tenure as Secretary of State of Indiana. Sue Landske, a Republican member of the Indiana Senate, denied that this was the case. The 4th district is expected to remain favorable to Republicans.

Republican primary

Candidates

Nominee
Todd Rokita, incumbent U.S. Representative

Primary results

Democratic primary

Candidates

Nominee
Tara Nelson, information technology project manager

Eliminated in primary
Lester Moore, former Newton County Assessor

Primary results

Libertarian primary

Candidates

Nominee
Benjamin Gehlhausen, economics and professional flight technology major at Purdue University

General election

Results

District 5

The 5th district continues to include Hamilton County and the north side of Indianapolis, but received Democratic-leaning areas in northern Marion and Madison, and lost rural areas near Fort Wayne. The district is expected to continue to favor Republicans.

Republican incumbent Dan Burton, who had represented the 5th district since 2003 and previously represented the 6th district from 1983, retired rather than seeking re-election in 2012.

Republican primary

Candidates

Nominee
 Susan Brooks, former United States Attorney for the Southern District of Indiana

Eliminated in primary
 Jason Anderson
 Jack Lugar, attorney 
 John McGoff, physician and candidate for this seat in 2008 & 2010 
 David McIntosh, former U.S. Representative and lobbyist
 Matthew Mount
 Bill Salin, business analyst and Air Force veteran
 Wayne Seybold, Mayor of Marion and former Olympic pair skater

Withdrawn
Dan Burton, incumbent U.S. Representative

Declined
Mike Delph, state senator

Primary results

Democratic primary

Candidates

Nominee
Scott Reske, state representative,

Eliminated in primary
Tony Long, general motors retiree

Primary results

Libertarian primary

Candidates

Nominee
Chard Reid, economics and finance teacher at Plainfield High School.

General election

Endorsements

Results

District 6

The 6th district was made more favorable to Republicans in redistricting, and now stretches from Muncie to the Ohio River.

Republican incumbent Mike Pence announced in May 2011 that he would run for Governor of Indiana rather than for re-election to the House of Representatives.

Republican primary

Candidates

Nominee
 Luke Messer, former state representative, former executive director of the Indiana Republican Party, and candidate for the 5th District in 2010

Eliminated in primary
 Don Bates Jr., financial adviser and candidate for Senate in 2010
 Bill Frazier, state senator
 Travis Hankins, developer and candidate for 9th District in 2010
 John Hatter, human resources director at Ivy Tech Community College
 Joe Sizemore, factory worker
 Allen Smith, Bartholomew County coroner and The Biggest Loser contestant
 Joseph S. Van Wye Sr., part-time service technician and part-time worker for Lifetime Resources

Declined
Nate LaMar, president of the Henry County Council
Jean Lesing, state senator
Mike Pence, incumbent U.S. Representative
Andrew Phipps, retired educator and candidate for Indiana Senate in 2002 and 2006
Mike Sodrel, former U.S. Representative 
T.J. Thompson, candidate for this seat in 2010;

Primary results

Democratic primary

Candidates

Nominee
 Bradley Bookout, former Delaware County council member

Eliminated in primary
 Dan Bolling, biotech entrepreneur
 Jim Crone, sociology professor at Hanover College 
 Susan Hall Heitzman, small business owner
 George Holland, salesman

Declined
Lane Siekman, attorney;
Barry Welsh, nominee for this seat in 2006, 2008 & 2010

Primary results

Libertarian primary

Candidates

Nominee
Rex Bell, owner of a contracting business in the New Castle area

General election

Endorsements

Results

District 7

The 7th district lost Democratic-leaning areas in northern Marion County in redistricting, while acquiring more Republican areas in the south of the county. Nonetheless, the district was expected to remain favorable to Democrats.

Democratic primary

Candidates

Nominee
André Carson, incumbent U.S. Representative

Eliminated in primary
Bob Kern, paralegal
Pierre Pullins, warehouse worker
Woodrow Wilcox

Primary results

Republican primary

Candidates

Nominee
Carlos May, former aide for Indianapolis Mayor Greg Ballard

Eliminated in primary
Steve Davis, former Southport Police Chief 
J.D. Miniear, christian ministry outreach
Tony Duncan, Army veteran and Union worker
Larry Shouse
Wayne Harmon, Parole Agent and former Marine
Catherine Ping, Army Reserve Lieutenant Colonel and business owner

Primary results

General election

Results

District 8

The 8th district was made slightly more favorable to Democrats in redistricting, as a result of the removal of Fountain County, Putnam County and Warren County, all of which favor Republicans, and the addition of Dubois County, Perry County, Spencer County and part of Crawford County, all of which strongly favor neither party. Republican incumbent Larry Bucshon ran for re-election.

Republican primary

Candidates

Nominee
 Larry Bucshon, incumbent U.S. Representative

Eliminated in primary
 Kristi Risk, stay-at-home mom

Primary results

Democratic primary
The 8th district's Democratic candidates agreed to participate in a caucus in which the chairs and vice chairs of 38 counties would vote to decide the party's nominee; after which the candidates not selected would support the winner. Former state representative Dave Crooks was endorsed as the Democratic nominee by party leaders on December 10, 2011.

Candidates

Nominee
Dave Crooks, former state representative

Eliminated in primary
Thomas Barnett
William Bryk, attorney & perennial candidate

Withdrawn
Patrick Scates, former aide to former U.S. Representative Brad Ellsworth
Terry White, chair of the Warrick County Democratic Party

Declined
Brad Ellsworth, former U.S. Representative and nominee for Senate in 2010 
Trent Van Haaften, former state representative and nominee for this seat in 2010

Primary results

Libertarian primary

Candidates

Nominee
Bart Gadau

General election

Endorsements

Predictions

Results

District 9

The 9th district previously consisted mostly of rural areas in southeastern Indiana but was made more favorable to Republicans when the legislature extended it northwards to include Johnson County and Morgan County while also incorporating suburbs of Louisville, Kentucky. Republican incumbent Todd Young ran for re-election

Republican primary

Candidates

Nominee
Todd Young, incumbent U.S. Representative

Primary results

Democratic primary

Candidates

Nominee
 Shelli Yoder, professional development director at Indiana University in Bloomington Kelley School of Business and former Miss Indiana

Eliminated in primary
 Jonathan D. George, former Air Force officer who served on the United States National Security Council
 John Griffin Miller, activist
 John Tilford, military veteran and activist for veterans 
 Robert Winningham, former employee of U.S. Representative Lee Hamilton

Declined
Sam Locke, Air Force veteran and candidate for State Auditor in 2010
Peggy Welch, state representative,

Primary results

General election
Jason Sharp was nominated by the Libertarian Party but later dropped out.

Results

References

External links
Election Division at the Indiana Secretary of State
Primary election results
Indiana U.S. House at Ballotpedia
Indiana U.S. House at OurCampaigns.com
Campaign contributions for U.S. Congressional races in Indiana from OpenSecrets
Outside spending at the Sunlight Foundation
Indiana Congressional Districts Adopted 2011
Map of the congressional districts under which the 2012 elections will be contested, published by the Indiana Business Research Service
2010 Census data tabulation for the new congressional and state legislative districts, published by the Indiana Business Research Service (Microsoft Excel format)

Indiana
2012
United States House of Representatives